Wolfowitz is a surname. Notable people with the surname include:

 Jacob Wolfowitz, (1910–1981) American statistician and information theorist
 Clare Selgin Wolfowitz (born 1945), American anthropologist
 Paul Wolfowitz, (born 1943) American political figure, son of Jacob

Jewish surnames
Yiddish-language surnames